Carlos Carneiro may refer to:

 Carlos Carneiro (footballer) (born 1975), Portuguese retired footballer
 Carlos Carneiro (handballer) (born 1982), Portuguese handballer
 Carlos Carneiro (cyclist) (born 1970), Portuguese road cyclist